

PROUD Academy is a private school in New Haven, Connecticut. The school was incorporated as a non-profit private school in June 2021. The academy's planned opening will be in September 2023; PROUD hopes to begin the school year with 120 students. The name "PROUD" Academy stands for "Proudly Respecting Our Unique Differences" Academy.

The academy will focus on being a safe space free of harassment and bullying for individuals who have traditionally faced discrimination and harassment. The school will support a broadly inclusive student body bringing together students of different sexual orientations, gender identities/expressions, origins, and faiths.

See also
 Betsy Ross Arts Magnet School
 ACES Educational Center for the Arts

References

Notes

Citations

External links
 Official website

Experiential learning schools
Education in New Haven, Connecticut
Educational institutions established in 2021